= Yong Sang Seo =

Korean-French pastry chef

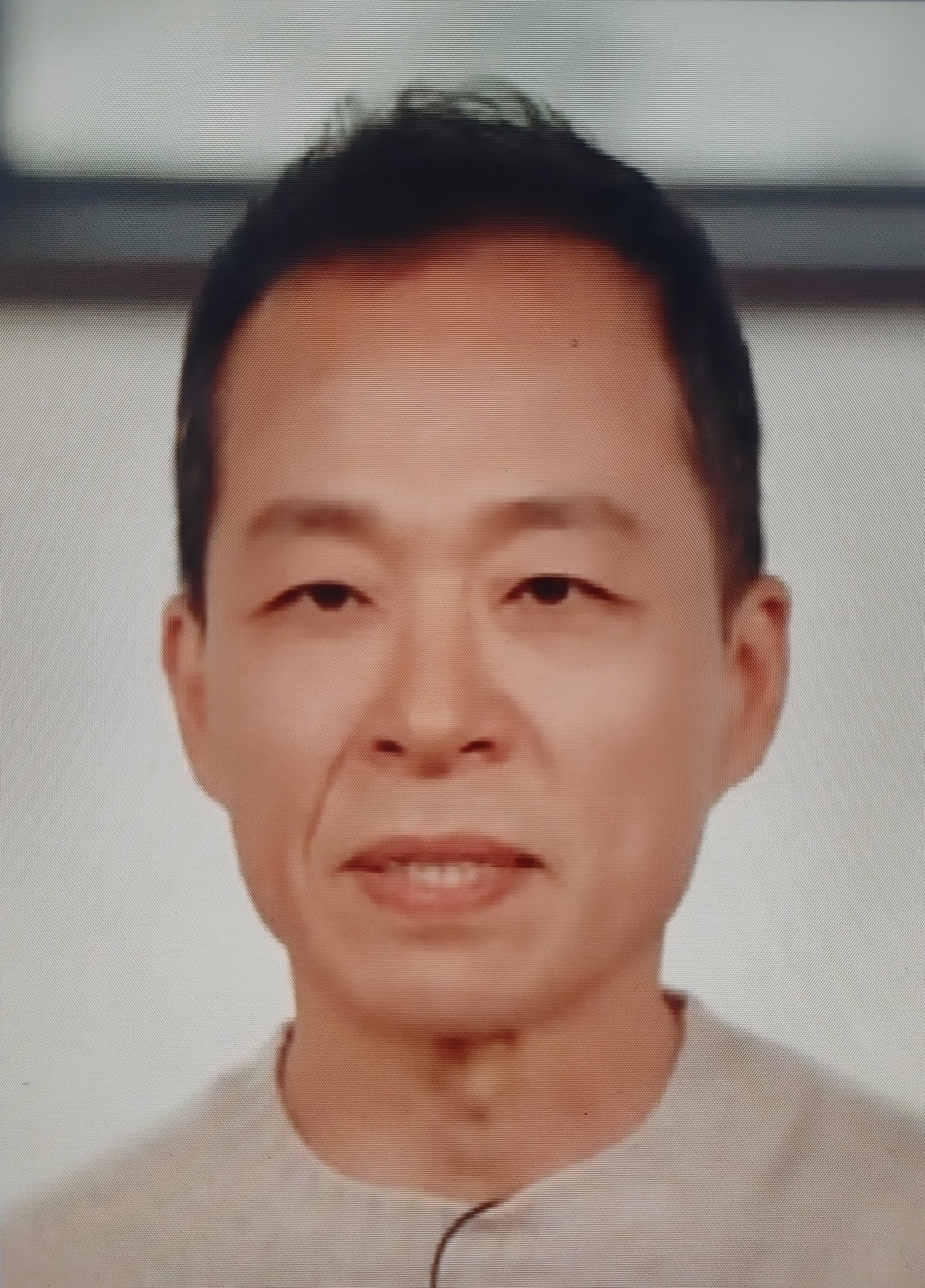
- Born: January 28, 1970 (age 56); Seoul, South Korea
- Education: GRETA (GRoupements d’ETAblissements)
- Alma mater: Yonsei University (BS, BA); in physics and philosophy
- Occupation: Chef
- Spouse: Seounghee Yang

Korean name
- Hangul: 서용상
- RR: Seo Yongsang
- MR: Sŏ Yongsang

Yong Sang Seo (Korean: 서용상;born January 28, 1970) is a Korean-French pastry chef. He owns bakery, Mille & Un in Paris' district 6. In 2023, Yong Sang Seo was awarded the best Flan IIe-de-France in Paris' annual "Grand Prix de la Flan".

== Biography ==
Yong Sang Seo was born in Seoul, Korea in 1970. After graduating from physics and philosophy, Yong Sang Seo dropped out of seminary and began baking at the age of 30. He has been making bread every day for 25 years.

Yong Sang Seo worked at Kim Young Mo Bakery in Seoul, Korea and Poivrier Bakery in Hiroshima, Japan before moving to Angers, France with two children in 2002 to study baking and pastry.

In 2007, he became the first Korean to open Le Grenier à Pain Lafayette in France. In 2010, his wife, Seounghee Yang relocated to Paris after her husband had settled down there first and began helping out at Le Grenier à Pain Lafayette with the bakery's day-to-day operations, which she continues today.

In 2013, he placed 8th in the Paris Traditional Baguette Competition. In March 2019, Yong Sang Seo confidently started his own bakery, "Mille & Un" in Paris’ district 6, the heart of Paris. It offers both traditional French bread with Korean flavors to appeal to the bread connoisseurs in Paris. Being particular and holding the belief that bread must be made with the best ingredients, Yong Sang Seo's dream for Koreans to love their bread, not just in France, led to the launching of a second Mille & Un in Korea in 2024.

== Personal life ==
Yong Sang Seo married in 1995.

== Books ==
Seo has written a biography: I'm a Korean Baker in Paris.

== Other televised appearances ==
Yong Sang has appeared in You Quiz on the Block on tvN.
